Guillermo Cabrera Infante (Gibara, 22 April 1929 – 21 February 2005) was a Cuban novelist, essayist, translator, screenwriter, and critic; in the 1950s he used the pseudonym G. Caín, and used Guillermo Cain for the screenplay of the cult classic film Vanishing Point (1971).

A one-time supporter of the politics of Fidel Castro, Cabrera Infante went into exile to London in 1965. He is best known for the novel Tres tristes tigres (literally: "three sad tigers", published in English as Three Trapped Tigers), which has been compared favorably to James Joyce's Ulysses.

Biography 
Born in Gibara in Cuba's former Oriente Province (now part of Holguín Province), in 1941 he moved with his parents, to Havana, which would be the setting of nearly all of his writings other than his critical works. His parents were founding members of the Cuban Communist Party.

Originally he intended to become a physician, but abandoned that in favor of writing and his passion for the cinema. Starting in 1950, he studied journalism at the University of Havana. Under the Batista regime he was arrested and fined in 1952 for publishing a short story which included several English-language profanities. His opposition to Batista later cost him a short jail term.

He married for the first time in 1953. From 1954 to 1960 he wrote film reviews for the magazine Carteles, using the pseudonym G. Caín; he became its editor in chief, still pseudonymously, in 1957. With the triumph of the Cuban Revolution in 1959 he was named director of the Instituto del Cine. He was also head of the literary magazine Lunes de Revolución, a supplement to the Communist newspaper Revolución; however, this supplement was prohibited in 1961 by Fidel Castro.

He divorced in 1961 and in the same year married his second wife, Miriam Gomez, an actress. Having fallen somewhat out of favor with the Castro regime (the government's ban on a documentary on Havana nightlife made by his brother led to his being forbidden to publish in Cuba), he served from 1962 to 1965 in Brussels, Belgium, as a cultural attaché. During this time, his sentiments turned against the Castro regime; after returning to Cuba for his mother's funeral in 1965, he went into exile, first in Madrid, then in London.

In 1966 he published Tres tristes tigres, a highly experimental, Joycean novel, playful and rich in literary allusions, which intended to do for Cuban Spanish what Mark Twain had done for American English, recording the great variety of its colloquial variations. It won the 1964 Premio Biblioteca Breve for best unpublished novel.

He co-wrote the script for Richard C. Sarafian's 1971 cult film Vanishing Point under the pseudonym Guillermo Caín.

Although he is considered a part of the famed Latin American Boom generation of writers that includes his contemporary Gabriel García Márquez, he disdained the label. Ever an iconoclast, he even rejected the label "novel" for his masterpieces, such as Tres tristes tigres and La Habana para un infante difunto. He was influential to Puerto Rican and Cuban writers such as Luis Rafael Sánchez (La guaracha del Macho Camacho) and Fernando Velázquez Medina (Última rumba en La Habana).

In 1997 he received the Premio Cervantes, presented to him by King Juan Carlos of Spain. He died on February 21, 2005, in London, of sepsis. He had two daughters from his first marriage.

Bibliography 
 Así en la paz como en la guerra (1960, "In peace as in war"; a pun on a line from the Lord's Prayer), short story collection
 Twentieth Century Job (1963, published in Spanish as "Un oficio del siglo XX"), collection of film reviews
 Tres tristes tigres (1967, published in English as Three Trapped Tigers; the original title refers to a Spanish-language tongue-twister, and literally means "Three Sad Tigers"; portions of this were later republished as Ella cantaba boleros), novel
 Vista del amanecer en el trópico (1974, published in English as "A View of Dawn in the Tropics"), novel
 O (1975), short story / essay collection
 Exorcismos de esti(l)o (1976, "Exorcisms of style"; estilo means style and estío, summertime), novel/short story collection
 La Habana para un Infante Difunto (1979, published in English as Infante's Inferno; the Spanish title is a pun on "Pavane pour une infante defunte", title of a piano piece by Maurice Ravel), novel
 Holy Smoke (1985, in English, later translated into Spanish as Puro Humo), a fictionalized "history" of cigars
 Mea Cuba (1991, the title implies "My Cuba" but also means "Cuba Pisses" or "Cuba is Pissing" and is a pun on "Mea Culpa"), political essays
 Arcadia todas las noches (1995, "Arcadia every night"), essays
 Delito por bailar el chachachá (1995, in English: Guilty of Dancing the ChaChaCha, 2001, translated by himself), short story collection
 Ella Cantaba Boleros (1996, "She Sang Boleros", consists of sections taken from Tres Tristes Tigres), two novellas
 Cine o sardina (1997, "Cinema or sardine", alludes to the choice his mother gave him between eating and going to the movies), collection of articles
 Vidas para leerlas (1998, "Lives to be read"), essays
 El Libro de las Ciudades (1999, "The Book of the Cities"), collection of writings
 Todo está hecho con espejos: Cuentos casi completos (1999, trans. "Everything is Made with Mirrors: Nearly Complete Stories"), short story collection
 Infantería (2000, title is a pun on his name and the Spanish for "infantry"), collection of writings
 La ninfa inconstante (2008, "The Inconstant Nymph", posthumous), novel
 Cuerpos divinos (2010, "Heavenly Bodies", posthumous), autobiographical novel
 Mapa dibujado por un espía (2013, "Map Drawn by a Spy", posthumous), novel

Cabrera Infante also translated James Joyce's Dubliners into Spanish (1972) and wrote screenplays, including Vanishing Point and the adaptation of Malcolm Lowry's Under the Volcano.

Further reading

English 
 Cabrera Infante's Tres tristes tigres: the trapping effect of the signifier over subject and text / Hartman, Carmen Teresa., 2003
 Guillermo Cabrera Infante: assays, essays and other arts / Nelson, Ardis L., 1999
 Guillermo Cabrera Infante: two islands, many worlds / Souza, Raymond D., 1996
 Guillermo Cabrera Infante and the cinema / Hall, Kenneth E., 1989
 Novel lives: the fictional autobiographies of Guillermo Cabrera Infante and Mario Vargas Llosa / Feal, Rosemary Geisdorfer., 1986
 Cabrera Infante in the Menippean tradition / Nelson, Ardis L., 1983
 A critical study of Tres tristes tigres by Guillermo Cabrera Infante / C.A.H.J Scheybeler., 1977
 Seven voices; seven Latin American writers talk to Rita Guibert. / Guibert, Rita., 1973
 Tongue Ties: Logo-Eroticism in Anglo-Hispanic Literature/ Pérez Firmat, Gustavo, 2003

Spanish 
 Buscando a Caín / Elizabeth Mirabal y Carlos Velazco., 2012
 Sobre los pasos del cronista/ Elizabeth Mirabal y Carlos Velazco., 2011.
 Acoso y ocaso de una ciudad : La Habana de Alejo Carpentier y Guillermo Cabrera Infante / Yolanda Izquierdo., 2002
 Para leer Vista del amanecer en el trópico de Guillermo Cabrera Infante / Celina Manzoni., 1999
 El heraldo de las malas noticias : Guillermo Cabrera Infante : ensayo a dos voces / Jacobo Machover., 1996
 Cabrera Infante y otros escritores latinoamericanos / Ignacio Díaz Ruiz., 1992
 Guillermo Cabrera Infante : La Habana, el lenguaje y la cinematografía / Ernesto Gil López., 1985
 Discontinuidad y ruptura en Guillermo Cabrera Infante / Isabel Alvarez-Borland., 1982
 Guillermo Cabrera Infante / Rosa María Pereda., 1979
 Guillermo Cabrera Infante y Tres tristes tigres / Reynaldo L Jiménez., 1977
 Guillermo Cabrera Infante / Julián Ríos., 1974
 La nueva novela hispanoamericana y Tres tristes tigres / José Sánchez-Boudy., 1971

See also 

 Cuban literature
 Latin American literature
 Caribbean literature

References

External links 
 
 Guillermo Cabrera Infante (in Spanish, part of Biografías y Vidas). Retrieved February 22, 2005. 
 Guillermo Cabrera Infante (in Spanish, from a site about the Premio Cervantes). Retrieved February 22, 2005.
 Guillermo Cabrera Infante (in Spanish, from LiteraturaCubana.com). Retrieved February 22, 2005.
 "Cuban-born novelist Guillermo Cabrera Infante dies", Associated Press obituary, on the site of The Guardian. Retrieved February 22, 2005.
 The Guillermo Cabrera Infante Papers are held at Princeton University Library, Special Collections.
 

1929 births
2005 deaths
20th-century essayists
20th-century male writers
20th-century Cuban novelists
20th-century translators
Cuban emigrants to England
Cuban people of Canarian descent
Cuban dissidents
Cuban essayists
Cuban male novelists
Cuban translators
English–Spanish translators
Translators of James Joyce
Male essayists
Postmodern writers
Premio Cervantes winners
Deaths from sepsis
Infectious disease deaths in England
Cultural attachés